"Sk8er Boi" (pronounced "skater boy") is a song by Canadian singer-songwriter Avril Lavigne, released as the second single from her debut album, Let Go (2002). It was written by Lavigne and the Matrix (Scott Spock, Lauren Christy, and Graham Edwards), and produced by the Matrix. The song combines punk rock, pop-punk, power pop, and alt-pop styles, which lyrically tells a story told from the singer's viewpoint about her rocker boyfriend and a girl he knew in high school who rejected him because he was a skateboarder and she did ballet.

The song was well-received by critics, with most commending its hook, calling the song "funny" and "clever". It also received a Grammy nomination for Best Female Rock Vocal Performance at the 2003 edition. Commercially, "Sk8er Boi" was a success, reaching the top 10 in more than ten countries, such as Australia, New Zealand, the United Kingdom and the United States (becoming Lavigne's second top 10 single on the Billboard Hot 100 chart) and sold over 1.8 million copies worldwide. According to Spin, "Sk8er Boi" has the fifth best pop-punk chorus of the 21st century.

The music video for the song, directed by Francis Lawrence, features a concert on a city street with Lavigne singing on the hood of a car with a crowd rocking out around her. It was a success on Total Request Live and was voted one of the best music videos of the decade by BT TV. The song has been performed in all of Lavigne's concert tours to date.

Background and release
After being signed to Arista Records in November 2000 upon the authorization of the label's CEO, Antonio "L.A." Reid, Lavigne moved to New York with the assistance of Reid. There, she began working on her debut album, Let Go, collaborating with a host of prime songwriters and producers. While being on the verge of getting dropped off Arista, after an unsuccessful year of writing, Lavigne came to the attention of the three-piece production team the Matrix, who later discovered that she wanted songs with punk rock inclinations. After writing "Complicated" together, Reid agreed with the musical direction Lavigne and the Matrix were taking, and sent Lavigne back to the Matrix to work with them on more songs.

During the sessions, they wrote 10 songs, with "Sk8er Boi" being one of the six songs on the album's final track list. After the huge success of "Complicated", "Sk8er Boi" was selected as the album's second single, being the more controversial choice, according to Reid: "Some people just really didn't get that. And with the first video, there was some concern that maybe because it's so young and so playful, it might alienate more serious music lovers."

Composition and lyrics

"Sk8er Boi" was written by Lavigne, while the production team the Matrix (consisting of Lauren Christy, Graham Edwards and Scott Spock) co-wrote, arranged and produced the track. "Sk8er Boi" is a punk rock, pop punk, emo, alt-pop, and power pop song about a snobby girl who rejects a skateboarder who has a crush on her despite secretly returning his feelings, letting her friends' prejudices sway her decision-making. Later on, he becomes a superstar musician (even playing guitar on MTV) and has moved on with another woman (who narrates the song) while she ultimately ends up as a young single mother.

Critical reception
"Sk8er Boi" received critical acclaim for its production. In a review for the album Let Go, Christina Saraceno of AllMusic called "Sk8er Boi" a "terrific power pop bounce", highlighting the song as a "track pick". Brendan Schroer of Sputnikmusic praised the track, writing that Lavigne "brings another injection of infectious vocal work, peppy but not overbearing." Nick Reynolds of BBC Music called it "brilliant", considering the song "a classic high energy pop song with crunchy guitars and a great hook." He also praised its tale, calling it "as slick and clever as an episode of Buffy. It bowls you over with its energy and sticks in your mind." Pat Blashill of Rolling Stone agreed, calling it "seventeen-year-old Lavigne's signature moment," further adding: "Over a rush of nouveau-punk guitar chords, she narrates a funny story line, but none of it would matter if Lavigne didn't have a voice, equal parts baby girl and husky siren, that seems capable of setting off car alarms several city blocks away."

Commercial performance
The song followed the success of Lavigne's debut single, "Complicated", which topped many charts worldwide and reached the top 10 in others. In Australia, "Sk8er Boi" debuted at its peak position, number three, and remained a further week there. In New Zealand, the song managed to spend 9 weeks until it reached the peak position, number two, on 8 December 2002. In the United States, "Sk8er Boi" debuted at number 72 on the Billboard Hot 100 issue date 14 September 2002, while on the issue date 2 November 2002, the song peaked at number 10. It became Lavigne's second consecutive top-10 hit. The song also topped Billboard Top 40 Mainstream airplay chart. As of June 2022, "Sk8er Boi" has sold 2,000,000 copies in the US. In the United Kingdom, the song was also a success, reaching number eight on the UK Singles Chart on 28 December 2002.

Awards and nominations
"Sk8er Boi" was nominated and won many awards. At the 45th Annual Grammy Awards ceremony, Lavigne received five nominations, including Best Female Rock Vocal Performance for "Sk8er Boi", but lost it to Sheryl Crow's "Steve McQueen". The song won "Favorite Song" at the 2003 Kids' Choice Awards, "Choice Music Single" at the 2003 Teen Choice Awards and "Best Pop Song" at Socan Awards.

Retrospective
In a 2011 AOL Radio listener's poll, "Sk8er Boi" was voted Lavigne's fourth best song. Robert Copsey of Digital Spy listed Lavigne's seven best singles of all time, placing "Sk8er Boi" at number four, saying: "Lavigne proved she was more than a one-hit wonder with her second single 'Sk8er Boi'. Despite the rebellious spelling of the title it turned out to be another solid effort, telling the tale of a girl who rejects a baggy-clothed boy who eventually goes on to be world-famous." Bill Lamb of About.com placed the song at number two, writing: "It has been derided in the past as being too naive lyrically. However, with the benefit of hindsight, it seems perfectly pitched to her audience and the point in her career. The power pop hook of the song sticks strongly in your head. Later perky pop excursions still pale next to this one."

Music video

The music video was directed by Francis Lawrence and premiered on 22 August 2002 on Total Request Live. The video shot to number-one on Total Request Live on its second day of the countdown. The video was considered the third "Best music video of the decade" in the UK by BT Vision, while Entertainment Tonight Canada ranked the video at number 2 on her "Top 10 Best Music Videos".

Synopsis
The video centers around an impromptu concert held by Lavigne in a Los Angeles street intersection. It begins by showing several of Lavigne's friends and band members promoting the concert in advance via graffiti, flyers, email and posters. Lavigne and her band arrive at the location and begin performing on the roofs of their cars; a crowd quickly gathers. Towards the end of the song, police cars and a helicopter arrive to disperse the crowd, while Lavigne uses her guitar to break the car windshield. Lavigne then throws the guitar onto the road and looks up at the helicopter, where a shot was taken for the single's artwork.

The impromptu concert was filmed in the intersection of 7th St & S Spring St in Los Angeles on 28 July 2002, after the remainder of the scenes had been completed the previous day.

Track listings

 US DVD
 "I'm with You"
 "Sk8er Boi"
 "Behind-the-Scenes Footage"
 "Let Go TV Spots"

 Australian CD
 "Sk8er Boi" – 3:23
 "Get Over It" – 3:27
 "Nobody's Fool" (recorded live in Vancouver for Z95) – 3:58

 European CD
 "Sk8er Boi" – 3:23
 "Get Over It" – 3:27

 UK CD
 "Sk8er Boi" – 3:23
 "Get Over It" – 3:27
 "Nobody's Fool" (live at The Commodore, Vancouver, BC) – 3:58
 "Sk8er Boi" (video)

 UK cassette
 "Sk8er Boi" – 3:23
 "Get Over It" – 3:27
 "Nobody's Fool" (live at The Commodore, Vancouver, BC) – 3:58

Charts

Weekly charts

Year-end charts

Certifications

Release history

Cover versions and appearances in other media
In 2003, Paramount Pictures optioned the song for adaptation into a feature film, hiring writer/producer David Zabel to adapt its words. The film would focus on the two teens from different backgrounds and the social constraints in which they find themselves. However, as of April 2008, the film has apparently been abandoned or is in development hell. Eurodance group Cascada recorded a dance cover of the song for the European and Japanese editions of their 2007 album Perfect Day. The song was featured on the Australian compilation album Hits For Kids 5 (2004).

A cover version of the song by Angela Michael appears in the video game Elite Beat Agents for the Nintendo DS. The song is also included in SingStar Pop, a PlayStation 2 game and another cover version is featured in Rock Revolution by Konami. The song was also used in a montage of funny rollerskates and skateboard clips in an edition of America's Funniest Home Videos. "Sk8er Boi" was featured in the television series Cold Case (Season 3, "The Promise", 2 October 2005). In 2008, HBO included the song in the episode "Get Some" of the miniseries Generation Kill. The song is sung by Cpl. Josh Ray Person as he is urinating in the desert. Filipino rock singer Kean Cipriano covered the song for his performance in the second season of Your Face Sounds Familiar, in which he impersonates Lavigne. Filipino pop singer Justin Alva covered the song for his performance in the third season of Your Face Sounds Familiar, in which he impersonates Lavigne. The song is interpolated by American singer and rapper Ashnikko on her 2021 mixtape Demidevil as a song titled "L8r Boi" which tells the story of the characters in original song reimagined ten years later.
On 19 February 2022, Tomorrow X Together member HueningKai released a cover of the song after making a reference to it in a tweet of him behind the scenes of "Loser=Lover" and Avril herself retweeting it with rock on emojis.
STAYC's Yoon released a cover on 26 January 2023.

References

Songs about youth subcultures
2002 singles
Avril Lavigne songs
Song recordings produced by the Matrix (production team)
Songs written by Avril Lavigne
Songs written by Lauren Christy
Songs written by Graham Edwards (musician)
Songs written by Scott Spock
Music videos directed by Francis Lawrence
Arista Records singles
Power pop songs
Alternative pop songs
Pop punk songs
Punk rock songs